Phenacolepas is a genus of small sea snails that have a limpet-like or patelliform shell. These are marine gastropod mollusks in the family Phenacolepadidae.

Species
Species within the genus Phenacolepas include:
 Phenacolepas arabica
 Phenacolepas asperulata A. Adams, 1858
 Phenacolepas calva
 Phenacolepas cinnamomea
 Phenacolepas crenulata
 Phenacolepas fischeri (Rochebrune, 1881)
 Phenacolepas galathea (Lamarck)
 Phenacolepas immeritus
 Phenacolepas malonei
 Phenacolepas mirabilis
 Phenacolepas nobilis
 Phenacolepas omanensis
 Phenacolepas osculans
 Phenacolepas tenuisculpta

References

Phenacolepadidae